Steven M. Lisberger (born April 24, 1951) is an American film director, producer and writer famous for directing Tron in 1982.

Early life and education
Lisberger was born in 1951 in New York City and grew up in Hazleton, Pennsylvania. Of his ethnic background, he said that his father was Jewish while his mother's side was half Jewish and half Christian, both native German. Lisberger attended The Hill School in Pottstown, and Tufts University. He went on to become a 1974 graduate of the School of the Museum of Fine Arts in Boston, Massachusetts.

Career 
While attending Tufts University, Lisberger and five associates formed Lisberger Studios. Their first project of note was Cosmic Cartoon, which earned a Student Academy Award nomination in 1973. It was also featured in the nationally-released anthology film, Fantastic Animation Festival, in 1977. Through his company, Lisberger Studios, Lisberger directed the production of commercials, title sequences, and feature segments for programs, such as Make a Wish and Rebop.

In 1978, after moving to Venice, California, Lisberger and his business partner Donald Kushner conceived and produced a 90-minute animated film, Animalympics, for NBC's coverage of the 1980 Olympics. They then turned their creative efforts to the development of Tron at The Walt Disney Company. It was released in 1982 and has since become a cult classic.

His film Hot Pursuit (1987) features one of Ben Stiller's first speaking roles.

In 1989, Lisberger directed Slipstream, though the film was a critical and commercial failure.

Lisberger spent most of the 1990s and 2000s writing screenplays, with several being optioned by various studios.

In 2007, it was announced that he and Jessica Chobot were working together on a film project called Soul Code, though it was never produced.

Lisberger tried for years to convince Disney to develop a Tron sequel, though the project frequently languished in development hell. Eventually, Disney green-lit Tron: Legacy,  and it was released in 2010 for which Lisberger served as producer. The film was a success at the box office and was followed by a television series, Tron: Uprising.

Lisberger and his wife, Peggy, live in Santa Monica, California and have a son named Carl.

Filmography

References

External links

 
 

American animated film directors
American animated film producers
1951 births
Animators from New York (state)
Film producers from New York (state)
American male screenwriters
Film directors from New York City
The Hill School alumni
Living people
Film directors from Pennsylvania
Science fiction film directors
Screenwriters from New York (state)
American people of Jewish descent
Tufts University alumni